Brunópolis is a city in Santa Catarina, in the Southern Region of Brazil.

References

Municipalities in Santa Catarina (state)